Microlechia chretieni is a moth in the family Gelechiidae. It was described by Turati in 1924. It is found on the Canary Islands, Madeira, Crete and Sardinia, as well as in North Africa, France, Portugal, Spain, Greece and Palestine. It is also present in Saudi Arabia, southern Iran, western Pakistan, Mozambique, Namibia and South Africa.

The wingspan is about 9 mm for males and 8 mm for females. The forewings are pale brownish ochreous, with scattered blackish speckling. This appears in a very 
faintly indicated oblique transverse band, leaving the costa at about one-fourth and crossing the fold between two minute spots of raised blackish scales, the first below the fold, slightly anterior to that on the cell. Another pair of minute raised spots is situated one at the end of the cell, the other a little beyond it, above the outer extremity of the fold. Beyond and above these the costal and terminal margins are studded with groups of blackish scales at the base of the pale fawn-ochreous cilia, through which a slender dark line is traceable around the apex, but not toward the tornus. The hindwings are very pale bluish grey.

The larvae feed on Lycium europaeum, Lycium intricatum, Lycium afrum, Lycium barbarum and Hyoscyamus species. They mine the leaves of their host plant. The mine has the form of a full depth irregular corridor or blotch, containing little frass. Pupation make take place inside or outside the mine. The larvae have a uniform green body and black head.

The name honours French entomologist Pierre Chrétien.

References

Microlechia
Moths described in 1924